Republic Day is a national holiday in Armenia marking the anniversary of the First Armenian Republic in 1918. It is commonly celebrated with fireworks, concerts, parades, and parties. It is considered to be the national day of Armenia.

History

Shortly after the start of the First World War, the Ottoman Empire began forcible expulsion of Armenians from the empire. Women, children and elderly people were forced to leave Armenia and go to Syria and Russia. 1 to 1.5 million people were killed in what is now known as the Armenian genocide. Following the genocide, the Armenian National Council Declared its sovereignty on 28 May 1918. Armenia was proclaimed an independent republic on May 28, 1918. The republic immediately experienced massive hunger, and a massive influx of refugees. The republic was short lived, and as of December 2, 1920, the Red Army invaded Armenia and proclaimed it a Soviet Republic. Armenia regained its independence in 1991.

Festivities

The first celebrations
The first celebrations of Republic Day since the Sovietization of Armenia took place at the start of the Karabakh movement. On the First Republic's 70th anniversary in 1988, the Flag of Armenia was first raised in front of Matenadaran. During a demonstration numbering tens of thousands in Yerevan, 5000 protesters appeared carrying the tricolor flag and portraits of Andranik, Garegin Nzhdeh and Armenian fedayis. According to Verluise, this day "marked a radicalisation of [Armenian] national aspirations".

General celebrations
The Republic Day celebrations coincide with the anniversary of the Battle of Sardarabad, which pushed the invading Ottoman Army out of Armenia. Every year, the President of Armenia, the Prime Minister of Armenia, and the President of Artsakh visits the Sardarapat Memorial to lay a wreath at the monument. Many cultural and military events also take place on Republic Day. While in 2020, republic day was marked without the traditional public events and festive ceremonies due to restrictions to slow the spread of COVID-19.

100th Anniversary

2018 marked the centennial of the founding of the First Armenian Republic. Armenia spent 618 million dram on events marking the anniversary. The ceremonies (known as the "Century of Victories") were attended by the President Armen Sarkissian, Prime Minister Nikol Pashinyan, President of Artsakh Bako Sahakyan, and Catholicos of All Armenians Karekin II.

A ceremonial military parade was held at the Sardarapat Memorial, which featured hundreds of soldiers dressed in military uniforms from the First Armenian, Red Army uniforms from World War II, as well as veterans of the first Nagorno-Karabakh War. Historical vehicles such as the T-90 were also on display. It also featured subdivisions of corps of the Armenian Army, the Border Service of the National Security Service, the Police of Armenia, forces of the Ministry of Emergency Situations and, for the first time, servicemen of the Russian 102nd Military Base.

In the evening, on Yerevan's Republic Square, a 3D show took place.

References

External links 

Armenia Marks Republic Day With Military Parade

 Հեծելազորից մինչեւ «Սմերչ». զինվորական շարանցում՝ Հայաստանի եւ Արցախի ԶՈՒ-ի մասնակցությամբ
 The First Republic Day Parade in 1992, Part 1 and Part 2

May observances
Armenian culture
Armenia
Armenia
Public holidays in Armenia
Public holidays in the Republic of Artsakh